Falling Leaves is a 1966 Soviet drama film directed by Otar Iosseliani. The film was screened at the International Critics' Week of the 1968 Cannes Film Festival.

Cast 
 Ramaz Giorgobiani as  Nico
 Gogi Kharabadze as Otari
 Marina Kartsivadze as Marine
 Aleksandre Omiadze as Head of wine factory 
 Baadur Tsuladze as Archili
 Tengiz Daushvili as Nodari 
 Bukhuti Zakariadze as Ilo 
 Akaki Kvantaliani as Daviti
 Dodo Abashidze as Rezo

References

External links 

1966 drama films
Soviet-era films from Georgia (country)
Soviet black-and-white films
Films directed by Otar Iosseliani
1966 films
Drama films from Georgia (country)
Black-and-white films from Georgia (country)